Kimhwa County is a kun, or county, in Kangwŏn province, North Korea.

Geography
Kimhwa county is primarily mountainous, but the county's southeastern region is low-lying. The highest peak is Pae'gyŏnsan (백연산).  The chief stream is the Pukhan River.  Approximately 80% of the county's area is taken up by forestland.

Administrative divisions
Kimhwa county is divided into 1 ŭp (town), 1 rodongjagu (workers' district) and 13 ri (villages):

Economy
The chief local industry is agriculture. Local crops include potatoes, maize, rice, wheat, and barley. In addition, livestock and silkworms are raised, and orchards are cultivated. There are several mines, exploiting local deposits of manganese, gold, copper, talc, fluorite, barite, and anthracite.

Transportation
Kimhwa is connected to the rest of North Korea by road.

See also
Geography of North Korea
Administrative divisions of North Korea

References

External links

Counties of Kangwon Province (North Korea)